Risalat al-Huquq  is a work attributed to Ali ibn al-Husayn, the great-grandson of the Islamic prophet, Muhammad, and the fourth Shia Imam, also known by the honorific title Zayn al-Abidin. According to Chittick, Risalat al-Huquq is as an elaboration of a saying by Muhammad about individual rights that illustrates how Islam diverges from the modern western notions of human rights, though it remains close to other religious traditions. Risalat al-Huquq is related by Abu Hamza al-Thumali, a close confidante of Zayn al-Abidin. The first version of Risalat al-Huquq appears in al-Khisal and al-Amali by Shaykh al-Suduq, and the second one in Tuhaf al-Uqul by Ibn Shu'ba. In one of its two versions, Risalat al-Huquq is prefaced by the sentence "This is the treatise of Ali ibn al-Husayn to one of his companions," suggesting that it was brought to life at the request of a disciple.

Human rights in Risalat al-Huquq 
Risalat al-Huquq has been viewed as an elaboration of Muhammad's saying, "Surely your Lord has a right against you, your self has a right against you, your wife has a right against you." Some other versions of this well-attested hadith, possibly uttered on other occasions, include other rights and the clause, "So give to everyone who possesses a right his right." In Risalat al-Huquq, Zayn al-Abidin exhaustively details what is meant by "everyone who possesses a right," basing himself in the Quran and the hadith literature. 

Even though Risalat al-Huquq has been translated asTreatise of Rights, a better translation of  here might have been 'duties', 'obligations', or 'responsibilities'. This is because Risalat al-Huquq is primarily concerned with the rights of others which the individual must observe, in sharp contrast with western views where human rights are often interpreted as the rights of the individual. Without this divine guidance, Islam maintains that the individual is unable to perceive his best interests in the midst of his own ego and self-centered desires.

Authenticity
Risalat al-Huquq, attributed to Zayn al-Abidin, appears in
 al-Khisal by Shaykh al-Suduq
 al-Amali by Shaykh al-Suduq
 Man La Yahdhuruhu al-Faqih by Shaykh al-Suduq
 Tuhaf al-Uqul by Ibn Shu'ba
The author of Tuhaf al-Uqul does not identify his sources, while al-Suduq provides in his al-Khisal the chain of transmission:

Transmitted in two versions, Risalat al-Huquq begins with "The greatest right of God..." in Man La Yahdhuruhu al-Faqih, which does not include the brief overview of the rights as it appears in Tuhaf al-Uqul. In the latter source, the number of rights introduced and then detailed in the body of Risalat al-Huquq are fifty, while al-Suduq details fifty-one rights and the additional "right of hajj" in his al-Khisal and Man La Yahdhuruhu Al-Faqih. There is, however, no mention of the "right of hajj" in the introduction to Risalat al-Huquq in al-Khisal.

Chittick similarly writes that there are two versions of Risalat al-Huquq, one in al-Khisal and al-Amali, and the other in Tuhaf al-Uqul. The latter version appears to be a later recession, which has been edited for clarity. Chittick follows the former version in his translation.

Contents
Risalat al-Huquq begins with an introduction, which is followed by a detailed statement of the rights. The introduction briefly overviews the rights and begins as

The rights of God
The Greatest Right of God
The rights of yourself and your body organs
The right of the tongue
The right of hearing
The right of sight
The right of the legs
The right of the hand
The right of the stomach
The right of the private part

The right of deeds
The right of the prayer
The right of fasting
The right of the pilgrimage
The right of the charity
The right of the offering

The right of the leaders
The right of the possessor of authority
The right of the trainer through knowledge
The right of the trainer through ownership

The Right of the Subjects
The right of subjects through authority
The right of subjects through knowledge
The right of the wife
The right of your slave

The rights of relationship
The right of the mother
The right of the father
The right of the child
The right of the brother

The Right of Others
The right of the master
The right of the formerly enslaved person
The right of the one who treats you kindly
The right of the caller to prayer
The right of the ritual prayer leader
The right of the sitting companion
The right of the neighbor
The right of the companion
The right of the partner
The right of property
The right of the creditor
The right of the associate
The right of the adversary
The right of him who seeks your advice
The right of him whose advice you seek
The right of him who seeks your counsel
The right of the counselor
The right of the older one
The right of the younger one
The right of him who asks you
The right of whom you ask
The right of him through whom God makes you happy
The right of him who wrongs you
The right of people of your creed
The right of those under the protection of Islam
The concluding words of Zayn al-Abidin are

Treatise of Life
The documentary Treatise of Life is about the life style that is mindful of the rights in Risalatul Huquq. It was directed by Amir Farrokh Saber, an Iranian director, and broadcast on the IRIB news channel.

See also

 Sahifah of al-Ridha
 Al-Sahifa al-Sajjadiyya
 Nahj al-Balagha
 Al-Risalah al-Dhahabiah
 The Fifteen Whispered Prayers
 List of Shia books

References

External links
 al-islam.org
 The Charter of Rights translated to English by Sayyid Saeed Akhtar Rizvi
 Al-Risalat al-Huquq 

Shia literature
Islamic culture
Human rights in Islam
History of human rights
Treatises